Andrzej Piotr Świerniak (born February 22, 1950 in Wałbrzych) is a Polish mathematician, specializing in bioinformatics and control theory.

Biography 
In 1972 he obtained a master's degree in automation engineering at the Faculty of Automation of the Silesian University of Technology, and in 1975 he received a master's degree in mathematics at the University of Silesia in Katowice. In 1978, at the Faculty of Automatic Control and Computer Science of the Silesian University of Technology, he received his doctoral degree technical sciences. There, based on scientific achievements and his habilitation monograph, he was awarded in 1988 his Habilitation (higher doctoral degree). In 1996 he became a professor of technical sciences.

He became a full professor at the Silesian University of Technology at the Faculty of Automatic Control, Electronics and Computer Science and the director of the Institute of Automatic Control at this department. He became a member of the Automation and Robotics Committee of the Polish Academy of Sciences, the Committee of Biocybernetics and Biomedical Engineering of the Polish Academy of Sciences, the Central Commission for Degrees and Titles (Section VI - Technical Sciences), the Committee of the Scientific Research Committee (Electronics, Automation and Robotics, Information Technology and Telecommunications, T-11 ) and the Appeals Team of the Science Council at the Ministry of Science and Higher Education; Science Council; Appeal Team.

In 2012 he was elected a Fellow of the American Mathematical Society.

Awards and honors
 Golden Cross of Merit (1993)
 Medal of Merit for the Silesian University of Technology (1997)
 Knight's Cross of the Order of Polonia Restituta (1999)
 Silver Badge of the Meritorious SEP (2002)
 Medal of the National Education Committee (2003)
 Honorary Medal of Prof. Obrąpalski (2005)
 PTETiS Gold Badge (2008)
 Officer's Cross of the Order of Polonia Restituta (2011)

Selected publications

with Barbara Jarząb, Małgorzata Wiench, Krzysztof Fujarewicz, Krzysztof Simek, Michał Jarząb, Małgorzata Oczko-Wojciechowska, Jan Włoch et al.: "Gene expression profile of papillary thyroid cancer: sources of variability and diagnostic implications." Cancer Research 65, no. 4 (2005): 1587-1597.

References

University of Silesia in Katowice alumni
People from Wałbrzych
Polish mathematicians
Fellows of the American Mathematical Society
1950 births
Living people
Academic staff of the Silesian University of Technology